WESA (90.5 MHz) is a public FM radio station based in Pittsburgh, Pennsylvania. The station broadcasts with an ERP of 25 kW. WESA is a full member station of NPR and is also affiliated with Public Radio International and American Public Media.

History

Prior to being WESA, the station had the call sign WDUQ, owned by Duquesne University.  As of fall 2001, WDUQ was the most listened-to public radio outlet in Pittsburgh.

WDUQ began broadcasting on December 15, 1949 as a student laboratory on the Duquesne University campus, exposing students to new technology and giving local audiences access to cultural programs and information.  As each decade passed, WDUQ evolved as public radio grew and changed across the United States.

WDUQ was the home of the popular NPR news programs such as Morning Edition and All Things Considered as well as Car Talk and other programs.  The station also had a significant local and regional news effort, including in-depth coverage of a variety of issues.  The station also produced and distributed programming heard on public radio stations nationwide.  It was also known as the main outlet for jazz in Pittsburgh.

The station began carrying the programming of the newly formed Radio Information Service in 1976, a reading service for the visually impaired and print-handicapped on a sub-carrier channel.  WDUQ entered into a management agreement to handle RIS's day-to-day business operations in late 2005.

In 2006, WDUQ began to improve its signal strength to several distant communities. Broadcast translators now relay the main signal at FM 100.5 in Johnstown, Pennsylvania, FM 104.1 in Somerset, Pennsylvania, FM 92.3 in New Baltimore, Pennsylvania serving the Pennsylvania Turnpike, and FM 104.1 in Ligonier, Pennsylvania.

Relationship with Duquesne University
In October, 2007, WDUQ engendered controversy relative to corporate underwriting it received from Planned Parenthood of Western Pennsylvania.  In exchange for a gift in excess of $5,000, WDUQ began airing a series of ads for Planned Parenthood on October 8, 2007 that focused on breast and cervical cancer screening, STD treatment, and abstinence education, and which did not mention abortion-related services; Planned Parenthood, however, is the largest provider of abortions in the United States. On October 10, Duquesne University President Dr. Charles J. Dougherty ordered the station to return the money and cease airing the ads, citing conflict with the university's Catholic identity.

Sale and rebranding
Duquesne University announced in January 2010 that it would be searching for options to sell WDUQ. According to a spokesperson for the university, "Over the years, DUQ has evolved into a station that is virtually independent of the university. This could be an opportunity for Duquesne to reallocate assets for the enhancement of our educational enterprise and for the station to thrive on its own". Duquesne University decided to find a qualified buyer for WDUQ and its related frequencies. On January 14, 2011, it was announced that the university had accepted an offer from Essential Public Media, a joint venture between WYEP and Public Media Company, a subsidiary of public media proponent, brokerage and consultancy Public Radio Capital. Proceeds of the sale were to support new endowed chairs in African Studies and Mission Studies and endowments for stipends for graduate students and "scholarships to increase diversity in the student body".  The station's production facility moved to WYEP's Community Broadcast Center on the South Side and certain back-office functions were combined. WDUQ adopted a new call sign, WESA, upon the completion of the sale.

On July 1, 2011, the new management changed the format to NPR news and talk, while adding a full-time jazz station on its second HD channel. On September 15, 2011 the sale was finalized. The station operated under the branding "Essential Public Radio" for several months in 2012 before adopting the call letters as their primary brand.

Programming
WESA carries most of the NPR lineup along with locally-produced content including The Confluence, The Allegheny Front, and Rhythm Sweet & Hot. In late night hours, WESA carries the BBC World Service.

Translators

References

External links

ESA
NPR member stations
Jazz radio stations in the United States
Radio stations established in 1949
1949 establishments in Pennsylvania